Wu Jinyan (born August 16, 1990) is a Chinese actress. She is best known for her roles in television series Beauties at the Crossfire (2013), Story of Yanxi Palace (2018) and The Legend of Haolan (2019).

Early life and education
Wu was born in Chengdu, Sichuan. She began studying ballet at the age of 3. In 2000, she moved from her hometown to train at the Dance School Affiliated to Beijing Dance Academy, working to become a professional ballerina. After 7 years of boarding school, Wu joined the National Ballet of China, where she suffered repeated fractures in her feet. Wu later reported that these injuries caused her to pursue a different career to ballet. In 2009, Wu entered Beijing Film Academy, majoring in acting.

At the Affiliated school, Wu once had a chance to become an actress. The director even invited Wu's parents to persuade her to participate. But the role needed to shave the head, which would affect the dance presentation, she finally gave up this opportunity.

Career

2010–2017: Beginnings
During Wu’s sophomore year, she began her career by taking part in filming a time-travel television series, which has not been aired yet.

In 2011, Wu signed a contract with Zijun Entertainment, which opened up more acting opportunities for her.

In 2013, Wu played a dual role in the period political drama Beauties at the Crossfire, which achieved the highest ratings of the year for Anhui TV. She also got the nomination of Most Popular Actress at the Shanghai Television Festival.

In 2015, she appeared in the Guan Hu's crime film Mr. Six as a college student begging money to go home, opposite Feng Xiaogang.

In 2016, during the shooting of Waitan Zhong Sheng, Wu made acquaintance with Yu Zheng, a Chinese screenwriter and producer. Then she became an artist of Huanyu Entertainment and was cast as the lead role in the historical drama  Zhaoge.

2018–present: Rising popularity
In 2018, Wu starred in the historical drama Story of Yanxi Palace. The drama was incredibly popular in China and throughout Asia, streaming over 15 billion times and becoming the most googled show in 2018.
Wu gained increased attention and popularity with her role as Wei Yingluo.
She gained increased attention after starring in historical fiction The Legend of Haolan (2019) as Li Haolan / Zhao Ji. 

In 2019, Wu joined the cast of Youth Periplous, a Chinese variety show broadcast on Zhejiang Television. In August, she ranked 65th on Forbes China Celebrity 100 list.  In September, Wu portrayed a scriptwriter in the suspense romance drama You Are My Answer which aired on Hunan Television. In October, Wu appeared in the 2019 edition of Forbes 30 Under 30 China list, which consisted of 30 influential people under 30 years old who have had a substantial effect in their fields. 

On January 1, 2020, Wu starred in a music video for JJ Lin's song titled The Story of Us. Wu was invited by JJ Lin to participate in the music video after the popularity of Story of Yanxi Palace. This was her first music video. The spin-off of Story of Yanxi Palace, Yanxi Palace: Princess Adventures, where Wu reprised her role as consort Wei Yingluo, aired on Netflix one day before.

Wu participated in the period drama series Legacy which will premiere exclusively on WarnerMedia’s regional streaming service HBO Go at an unspecified date later in 2021. Legacy is a 1920s-set drama that chronicles the lives of the wealthy Yi family and three sisters who vie to inherit their father’s shopping mall business. In a time of upheaval and uncertainty, the three sisters set aside their differences to keep the business afloat and save their family.

Filmography

Film

Television series

Variety show

Music video

Other

Awards and nominations

Notes

References

External links
 
 
 

1990 births
Chinese film actresses
Chinese television actresses
Living people
21st-century Chinese actresses
Actresses from Beijing
Beijing Film Academy alumni